L'amore medico (Doctor Cupid, also known as The Love Doctor) is an opera in two acts by composer Ermanno Wolf-Ferrari. Based on Molière's comedy L'Amour médecin, the work uses an Italian language libretto by Enrico Golisciani. It premiered in a German version by Richard Batka on 4 December 1913 at the Hoftheater in Dresden under the title Der Liebhaber als Arzt.

The opera's United States premiere took place on 25 March 1914 at the Metropolitan Opera in New York City, conducted by Arturo Toscanini. It was first performed in Italy on 6 March 1929 at the Teatro Regio (Turin), conducted by Franco Capuana.

Roles

Recordings

Doctor Cupid (L'amore medico):  Wolf-Ferrari's Comic Opera Based on a Comedy by Molière, Punch Opera
Music conducted by Rex Wilder
Directed by Nelson Sykes
Pianists:  Robert Boberg and Barbara Ylvisaker
Sung in English by:  Anita Beltram (Lucinda), John Miller (Clitandro), Martha Moore Sykes (Lisetta), Milton Gorman (Papa), Richard Roussin (Doctor Tomes); Bettie Harris Fox (Astrologer); Rex Coston (Magician); Margaret Fittz (Gypsy)
Recording date:  1952
Label:  Abbey Records, LP No. 5
Wolf-Ferrari: Orchestral Works, BBC Philharmonic
Conductor: Gianandrea Noseda
Recording date: 2009
Label: Chandos, 10511 (CD)

References

Further reading
 Waterhouse, John C. G. (1992), "Amore medico, L" in The New Grove Dictionary of Opera, ed. Stanley Sadie (London)

External links

Work details, Corago, University of Bologna

Operas by Ermanno Wolf-Ferrari
Italian-language operas
1913 operas
Operas
Operas based on plays
Operas based on works by Molière